Ada or Ela Ada, is an Indian sweet and traditional Kerala delicacy, consisting of rice parcels encased in a dough made of rice flour, with sweet fillings, steamed in banana leaf and served as an evening snack or as part of breakfast. It can be seen even in parts of Tamil Nadu as well.
Grated coconut and rice flour are the two main ingredients. It is a snack made out of raw rice flour, sugar or jaggery and grated coconut. It is usually prepared on Onam. Poovada is prepared in the tip end of the plantain leaf as the Nivedyam for Onam, into this ada goes, with the coconut filling, a sprinkling of the Thumbapoo (a white flower Leucas aspera), making it more auspicious. Sometimes banana is also added in the filing which is coconut-jaggery-banana filling. Spicy Ottada is a unique breakfast with maida and rice flour as the main ingredients. It can be also made without maida, but using the rice flour alone and it is not steamed instead cooked on Tava or flame. Sometimes the fillings inside ada would be Chakkavaratti (Jackfruit Jam). Ada is also given as Prasadam (Sacred Food) to devotees at temples in Kerala.

See also 

 List of dumplings
Tamale

References

External links

Kerala cuisine
Indian rice dishes
Dumplings